Zavrh pri Borovnici is a small dispersed settlement in the hills above Borovnica in the Inner Carniola region of Slovenia. It belongs to the Municipality of Vrhnika.

Name
The name of the settlement was changed from Zavrh to Zavrh pri Borovnici in 1953.

References

External links
Zavrh pri Borovnici on Geopedia

Populated places in the Municipality of Vrhnika